{{Infobox song
| name       = Rock Star
| cover      = Rock Star NERD.jpg
| alt        =
| type       = single
| artist     = N*E*R*D
| album      = In Search Of...
| released   = July 29, 2002
| recorded   = 2001
| studio     =
| venue      =
| genre      = 
| length     = {{ubl|4:29 |4:19 {{small|(In Search Of... rock version)}}}}
| label      = Virgin
| writer     = N*E*R*D
| producer   = The Neptunes
| prev_title = Lapdance
| prev_year  = 2001
| next_title = Provider
| next_year  = 2002
}}

"Rock Star" is a song by American funk rock band N*E*R*D. It was released as the second single from their debut studio album In Search of... (2001). The song, the second single off the album, performed better in the United Kingdom than their previous single "Lapdance", peaking at number 15. It also became the group's first single to chart in Australia.

The song acted as a "second first single" of sorts, as it followed the group's debut "Lapdance", but was the first single to be released from the second, more streamlined version of In Search Of... rerecorded courtesy of Spymob rather than The Neptunes' trademark synths and electronic drum programming.

Music video
The song has a promotional music video directed by Hype Williams. It is technically unreleased, and unofficial, and was never broadcast on any music video stations, or networks; and it essentially became shelved, and was lost for quite some time. However, the video was remarkably later uploaded to the bands Sony Music/Vevo page. 

The video features the members of N.E.R.D. as High School students, in gym class, with their militant gym teacher, played by actor Randy Quaid. N.E.R.D., later starts performing "Rock Star", as the gym teacher, and other students dance along to the song. A Capuchin monkey then eventually runs into the gym, and starts havoc. 

Usage in other media
The song is featured in the films  The Guard,  Bringing Down the House and Blue Crush.

The Jason Nevins remix of the song has been featured in numerous video games such as Burnout Dominator, Burnout Paradise, and Forza Motorsport 2 as well as movie trailers for The Fast and the Furious: Tokyo Drift and the 2004 film Taxi, and was featured in an Apple iPod advert. The Jason Nevins Club Blaster Edit has appeared in SSX 3.

An edited version of it was also used as the theme song for NFL's 2002 game NFL Fever, with Pharrell Williams' vocal part replaced with the title game words. The song also appears in the music video game Band Hero.

The original version appears in the video games Mat Hoffman Pro BMX 2, SX Superstar, and True Crime: Streets of LA.

A portion of "Rock Star" also appears in an episode (season 3, episode 4: "Zoso") of the television series Californication, as well as an episode of Northern Irish comedy Pulling Moves''.

It placed at number 46 in the Triple J Hottest 100, 2002 in Australia, which is the world's largest annual music poll.

Track listing
 "Rock Star" (Jason Nevins remix edit)
 "Rock Star" (Formerly Rock Star Poser)
 "Rock Star" (Nevin's Classic Club Blaster – edited mix)
 "Rock Star" (video)

Charts

References

2002 singles
N.E.R.D. songs
Song recordings produced by the Neptunes
Songs written by Pharrell Williams
Songs written by Chad Hugo
2001 songs
Rap rock songs